Simbario is a comune (municipality) in the Province of Vibo Valentia in the Italian region Calabria, located about  southwest of Catanzaro and about  east of Vibo Valentia.

It is located on a plateau, within a stone's throw of the towns Spadola, and Brognaturo, and near the famous town and Monastery of Serra San Bruno.

Simbario borders the following municipalities: Brognaturo, Spadola, Cardinale, Pizzoni, Sorianello, Torre di Ruggiero, Vallelonga, Vazzano.

References

External links
 Official website

Cities and towns in Calabria